Miguel A. Pulido (born 1956) is an American politician and businessman who served as mayor of Santa Ana, California from 1994 to 2020.

Early life and education 
Pulido was born in Mexico City. He and his parents immigrated to the United States in 1961, settling in Fullerton, California. Pulido attended Troy High School and earned a Bachelor of Science degree in mechanical engineering from California State University, Fullerton.

Career 
Pulido was first elected to the City Council on November 4, 1986. He was the first Latino mayor of Santa Ana, serving in the position from November 8, 1994 to December 8, 2020. He is a member of the Democratic Party. In total, he would be elected to serve thirteen consecutive two-year terms as mayor.

Pulido has been a supporter of the OC Streetcar project.

Pulido opposed efforts in both 2006 and 2012 to institute mayoral term limits in Santa Ana. On November 6, 2013, Santa Ana voters overwhelmingly approved "Measure GG", which limited mayors to serve a total of eight years. Measure GG grandfathered terms which preceded its 2013 passage, thus allowing Pulido the possibility of serving an additional four two-year terms. Puldio would go on to be elected to three more terms after the passage of the bill. Since he had served for seven years after the 2013 term-limit measure went into effect, he is ineligible to serve another 2-year term, as that would cause him to exceed the eight-year tenure limit.

In 2016, Pulido was fined for failing to report campaign expenses.

Pulido ran as a candidate in the 2020 Orange County Board of Supervisors election, placing third in a field of four candidates.

Pulido's term as mayor ended on December 8, 2020.

Personal life 
Pulido and his wife, Laura, have three children. Pulido's wife works as a freelance writer.

Electoral history

City Council

Mayor

County Supervisor

References 

1956 births
21st-century American politicians
American politicians of Mexican descent
California Democrats
Hispanic and Latino American mayors in California
Living people
Mayors of places in California
People from Santa Ana, California
California city council members
Politicians from Mexico City
California State University, Fullerton alumni
Cal State Fullerton Titans athletes
People from Fullerton, California